Sportivnaya is a Moscow Metro station on the Sokolnicheskaya line. It is in the Khamovniki District in the Central Administrative Okrug of Moscow. Named for the nearby Luzhniki Olympic Complex, it opened in 1957. Passengers may make out-of-station transfers from Sportivnaya to Luzhniki on the Moscow Central Circle, which is about 200 meters away.

The architects were Nadezhda Bykova, I. Gokhar-Kharmandaryan, Ivan Taranov, and B. Cherepanov. Sportivnaya has white marble pylons with green marble accents and a ceiling of embossed asbestos-cement tiles rather than the usual plaster. The upper two floors of the three-story vestibule are home to the Moscow Metro Museum, which displays 70 years of Metro memorabilia.

Gallery

References

Moscow Metro stations
Railway stations in Russia opened in 1957
Sokolnicheskaya Line
Railway stations located underground in Russia
Khamovniki District